Admiral Sir Victor Albert Stanley KCB MVO (17 January 1867 – 9 June 1934) was a senior Royal Navy officer who commanded the Reserve Fleet.

Naval career
Born the son of the Frederick Stanley, 16th Earl of Derby, giving him the honorific "The Honourable", Stanley entered the navy in 1880, was appointed a Lieutenant in 1889, promoted to Commander in January 1901, and Captain 1905. He became naval attaché to Russia in 1905, commanding officer of the cruiser HMS Essex in 1909 and Captain of the Royal Naval College, Dartmouth in 1912. He served in World War I as commanding officer of the battleship HMS Erin from 1914 to 1917. He became naval attaché in the British delegation to Washington D. C. in 1918, Second-in-Command of the 1st Battle Squadron in 1919 and Vice Admiral Commanding the Reserve Fleet in 1924. He was promoted to full admiral on 2 March 1926, before retiring the same year.

He stood unsuccessfully for the Conservative Party in Blackpool in the 1923 General Election.

Family
He married in 1896 Canadian Annie Bickerton Pooley, daughter of Hon. C. E. Pooley, K.C., of British Columbia.

References

1867 births
1934 deaths
Royal Navy admirals
Royal Navy admirals of World War I
Knights Commander of the Order of the Bath
Commanders of the Royal Victorian Order
Conservative Party (UK) parliamentary candidates
Younger sons of earls